Francis Donovan may refer to:

Francis Patrick Donovan (1922–2012), Australian ambassador
Francis L. Donovan, United States Marine Corps general
Frank Donovan (footballer) (Francis James Donovan, 1919–2003), Welsh Olympic footballer
Frank Donovan (politician) (Francis Anthony Donovan, born 1947), Australian politician

See also
Frank Donovan (disambiguation)
Frances Donovan, journalist and presenter